Knee Deep in Hits is a compilation album by Rip Rig + Panic, released in 1990 by Virgin Records. The title of the album references a song from their debut album God, "Knee Deep in Shit". This song does not appear on the album itself.

Track listing

Personnel
Adapted from the Knee Deep in Hits liner notes.

Rip Rig + Panic
 Neneh Cherry – vocals
 Don Cherry – trumpet (4)
 David Defries – trumpet
 Derek Hanam – Groovebox
 Steve Noble – drums (9, 10)
 Andrea Oliver – vocals (9)
 Sean Oliver – bass guitar, vocals, production
 Jez Parfitt – baritone saxophone
 Gareth Sager – saxophone, guitar, piano, keyboards, vocals, design
 Sarah Sarahandi – viola
 Bruce Smith – drums, percussion, production
 Mark Springer – piano, saxophone, vocals
 Dave Flash Wright – saxophone

Production and additional personnel
 Adam Kidron – production (3, 6, 9, 10, 12)
 Jill Mumford – design
 Renegade – design

Release history

References

External links 
 

1990 compilation albums
Rip Rig + Panic albums
Albums produced by Adam Kidron
Virgin Records compilation albums